Leonaspis is a widespread genus of odontopleurid trilobite that lived from the Late Ordovician to the late Middle Devonian. Fossils of various species have been found on all continents except Antarctica.

Sources
 Fossils (Smithsonian Handbooks) by David Ward (Page 61)
 Leonaspis in the Paleobiology Database

References

Odontopleuridae
Odontopleurida genera
Ordovician trilobites
Silurian trilobites
Devonian trilobites
Trilobites of Africa
Trilobites of Asia
Trilobites of Oceania
Trilobites of Europe
Trilobites of North America
Trilobites of South America
Late Ordovician first appearances
Middle Devonian genus extinctions
Paleozoic life of the Northwest Territories
Paleozoic life of Nunavut
Paleozoic life of Quebec
Paleozoic life of Yukon